{{Infobox film
| name           = King of the Khyber Rifles
| image          = File:King of the Khyber Rifles.jpg
| caption        = 
| director       = Henry King
| producer       = Frank P. Rosenberg
| based_on       = 
| writer         = Ivan Goff and Ben Roberts (screenplay)Harry Kleiner (story)
| starring       = Tyrone PowerTerry Moore
| music          = Bernard Herrmann
| cinematography = Leon Shamroy
| editing        = Barbara McLean
| distributor    = Twentieth Century Fox
| released       = 
| runtime        = 100 minutes
| country        = United States
| language       = English
| budget         = $2,190,000
| gross          = $2.6 million (US rentals); $3.5 million (foreign rentals)<ref>Daily Variety, November 9, 1955, p. 4</ref>
}}King of the Khyber Rifles is a 1953 adventure film directed by Henry King and starring Tyrone Power and Terry Moore. The film shares its title but little else with the novel King of the Khyber Rifles (1916) by Talbot Mundy. This novel was also the basis for John Ford's The Black Watch'' (1929). The Khyber Pass scenes were shot in the Alabama Hills, Lone Pine, California. Released by 20th Century Fox, the film was one of the first shot in Technicolor CinemaScope.

Plot
In 1857, freshly-arrived Sandhurst-trained Captain Alan King, survives an attack on his escort to his North-West Frontier Province garrison near the Khyber Pass because of Ahmed, a native Afridi deserter from the Muslim fanatic rebel Karram Khan's forces. King was born locally and speaks Pashto. As soon as his fellow officers learn that his mother was a native Muslim (which got his parents disowned even by their own families), he encounters prejudiced discrimination, including Lieutenant Geoffrey Heath moving out of their quarters.

Brigadier General J. R. Maitland, whose policy is full equality among whites, learns that King knew Karram Khan as a boy and charges him with training and commanding the native cavalry. The general's daughter, Susan Maitland, takes a fancy to Alan, and falls in love, but the general decides to send her home to England after a kidnap attempt which was foiled by King. King volunteers to engage Karram Khan, the only man who can bring the normally divided local tribes together in revolt, pretending to have deserted.

Cast
 Tyrone Power as Captain Alan King
 Terry Moore as Susan Maitland
 Michael Rennie as Brigadier Gen. J. R. Maitland
 Murray Matheson as Major Ian MacAllister
 Gavin Muir as Major Lee
 John Justin as Lieutenant Geoffrey Heath
 Richard Wyler as Lieutenant Ben Baird
 John Farrow as Corporal Stuart
 Guy Rolfe as Karram Kha
 Frank DeKova as Ali Nur
 Argentina Brunetti as Lali
 Sujata as Native dancer
 Frank Lacteen as Ahmed

Development
Fox announced plans to remake the film in 1938. They were going to make it with Richard Greene or Victor McLaglen, but plans were pushed back because of the start of World War Two.

In 1951 the project was reactivated as a vehicle for Tyrone Power. Walter Doniger was to write the script and Frank Rosenberg was to produce. By December Henry Hathaway was listed as director.

In January 1953 Fox announced the film would be one of a series of "super specials" the studio would make in CinemaScope.

In April 1953 Henry King was given the job of directing and Power was confirmed as star. Guy Rolfe signed in June.

Filming started 14 July in Lone Pine, California. During filming, 22 people were injured when an explosion went off with more force than anticipated.

References

External links
 
 
 
Review of film at Variety
 
 

1953 films
American historical adventure films
20th Century Fox films
1950s historical adventure films
British Empire war films
Films set in the British Raj
Films directed by Henry King
Films scored by Bernard Herrmann
Films based on British novels
Films set in 1857
Films with screenplays by Harry Kleiner
CinemaScope films
1950s English-language films
1950s American films